Mandan is a city on the eastern border of Morton County and the eighth-largest city in North Dakota. Founded in 1879 on the west side of the upper Missouri River, it was designated in 1881 as the county seat of Morton County. The population was 24,206 at the 2020 census. Across the Missouri River from Bismarck, Mandan is a core city of the Bismarck-Mandan Metropolitan Statistical Area.

Naming
The city was named after the historic indigenous Mandan of the area. The Mandan are now part of the Three Affiliated Tribes of the Fort Berthold Reservation, spanning the upper Missouri River in the western part of the state. Their people also live in cities of the state and other areas. In the 2010 census, nearly 5% of the people in Mandan identified as Native American.

The Mandan Indian village at the southern base of Crying Hill prominent in east Mandan was recorded as early as 1738 and called Good Fur Robe, after their chief. The settlement was also recorded as Crying Hill and Two Face Stone, after their corresponding geographic features. It was one of six Mandan villages on the west riverbank between the Knife and Cannonball Rivers.

The credit for the city's incorporated name is a point of debate. John Andrew Rea arrived across the river in Bismarck in 1876 to serve as temporary editor of its newspaper during one of its founder's extended absences. Rea subsequently served as the register in the governmental land office in the territorial capital of Bismarck for eight years starting in June 1880. Rea claimed he and Northern Pacific Railroad engineer Thomas L. Rosser created the name. He wrote to the St. Paul Pioneer Press, which published and popularized the name that remains in use today. But the more generally accepted story credits the city's name to Frederic Gerard. Gerard had married Helena Catherine, an Arikara/Ree woman when he ran the Fort Berthold trading post. Gerard was appointed by the Dakota Territorial governor as Morton County's first assessor when it was established in March 1878. He was one of the first three men elected as a Morton County Commissioner in November 1878.

History

Early history
While Native Americans had long established settlements in the area along the river, the first white explorer was Frenchman Sieure de la Verendyre, whose expedition arrived in 1738. Not until the early 1800s did Euro-American frontiersmen come to the area with any regularity, the Lewis and Clark Expedition in 1804 and 1806, George Catlin in 1832, and Prince Maximilian and Karl Bodmer in 1834 being the most notable. In 1830 the American Fur Company established the Fort Clark Trading Post 40 miles upstream on the Missouri River to support trappers. To provide protection for the approaching rail line from the east and the homesteaders who would surely follow, the US Army established two outposts in the area in 1872 and 1873. Fort Greeley (later renamed Fort Hancock) was founded first on the river's east side. On the west side, an infantry post, Fort McKeen, was constructed on bluffs above the confluence of Heart and Missouri Rivers. In 1873 Congress authorized the addition of a cavalry post and changed its designation to Fort Abraham Lincoln when foot soldiers were deemed ineffective against their mounted adversaries. A permanent civilian settlement known as Lincoln was adjacent to the fort's north side.

When the Northern Pacific Railroad announced a pending river crossing in 1872, land speculators rushed to establish claims at probable locations for the inevitable city to be established on the west side of the crossing. But due to the national financial crisis in 1873, Northern Pacific postponed the river bridge project. Once its final location was announced, about five miles north of Fort Abraham Lincoln, a work camp appeared on the west riverbank in December 1878, complete with its own post office. The settlement also served as the base for the westward survey of the rail line.

On March 3, 1879, the post office was moved from the west bank of the Missouri River to the railroad's city site within blocks of Mandan's first railroad depot and freight building at Main Street and Stark Avenue (today's Collins Avenue). Four city names coincided exactly with four postmasters. The original railroad work camp's post office in 1878 was known as Morton. The name Mandan stuck for only eight days in March 1879 before being renamed Cushman by a postmaster with that surname. In September 1879, the post office returned to its designation of Mandan.

The City of Mandan was formally incorporated on February 24, 1881, and was named for the Mantani Indians, or "people of the bank." Mandan became the county seat for the replatted Morton County after the North Dakota legislature restored the prior county boundaries in 1881 after Burleigh County's land grab in 1879. The city of Lincoln had been county seat from 1878 to 1879.

Upon completion of the railroad to Montana in 1881, Fort Abraham Lincoln had fulfilled its primary purpose and gradually declined until it was formally abandoned in 1891. The City of Lincoln eventually dwindled into obscurity.

Transportation development

In the earliest days of Euro-American settlement, the main commercial transportation route was the Missouri River. Even after the rail arrived in the 1870s, the river remained the main north–south route until the mid-1930s' development of the national highway system. Steamboats used coal for fuel and the mine at Sims seven miles west of Mandan was a major source of lignite coal. If unavailable, steamboat crews bought wood from farmers along the river. Bellows Landing, the site of today's R M Hesket Power Station, was a refueling station with an icehouse. Historical records indicate it served steamboat traffic as early as 1832 when the riverboat Yellowstone reached Fort Union. Regular steamboat service on the Missouri began in 1860. Bellows Landing was renamed Rock Haven when the US government took over the operation in the late 1870s. The Army Corps of Engineers made extensive riverside improvements, including adding dry-dock and boat repair facilities. It supported the supply ships for the US Army's frontier forts and was considered the best landing on the river. Unlike most river harbors, the area was permanent and safe even during spring river ice breakup. It ceased operations in 1934.

Recent history
In 2013, Mandan was selected a finalist in the Rand McNally "Most Patriotic City" competition.

As part of the Bismarck-Mandan MSA, the area has repeatedly been ranked in the top 5 on both the Forbes list of "Best Small Places for Business and Careers" and the Milken Institutes' "Best Small Cities" list. The sister cities have also been included in CNN Money's list of the top 100 places to live.

Geography

Climate
This climatic region is typified by large seasonal temperature differences, with warm to hot (and often humid) summers and cold (sometimes severely cold) winters. According to the Köppen Climate Classification system, Mandan has a humid continental climate, abbreviated "Dfb" on climate maps.

Demographics

2010 census
As of the census of 2010, there were 18,331 people, 7,632 households, and 4,921 families residing in the city. The racial makeup of the city was 91.7% White, 0.6% African American, 4.9% Native American, 0.2% Asian, 0.1% Pacific Islander, 0.5% from other races, and 2.0% from two or more races. Hispanic or Latino of any race were 1.8% of the population.

There were 7,632 households, of which 31.6% had children under the age of 18 living with them, 48.4% were married couples living together, 11.5% had a female householder with no husband present, 4.6% had a male householder with no wife present, and 35.5% were non-families. 28.9% of all households were made up of individuals, and 10.5% had someone living alone who was 65 years of age or older. The average household size was 2.35 and the average family size was 2.89.

The median age in the city was 37.2 years. 23.9% of residents were under the age of 18; 8.2% were between the ages of 18 and 24; 27.3% were from 25 to 44; 27.2% were from 45 to 64; and 13.2% were 65 years of age or older. The gender makeup of the city was 49.2% male and 50.8% female.

2000 census
As of the census of 2000, there were 16,718 people, 6,647 households, and 4,553 families residing in the city. The racial makeup of the city was 94.98% White, 0.20% African American, 3.02% Native American, 0.33% Asian, 0.01% Pacific Islander, 0.15% from other races, and 1.30% from two or more races. Hispanic or Latino of any race were 0.78% of the population.

The top 6 ancestry groups in the city were German (61.3%), Norwegian (15.4%), Russian (13.1%), Irish (7.9%), English (4.2%), and Native American (3.02%).

There were 6,647 households, out of which 35.7% had children under the age of 18 living with them, 54.1% were married couples living together, 10.6% had a female householder with no husband present, and 31.5% were non-families. 26.4% of all households were made up of individuals, and 10.1% had someone living alone who was 65 years of age or older. The average household size was 2.48 and the average family size was 3.01.

In the city, the population was spread out, with 27.0% under the age of 18, 9.0% from 18 to 24, 29.7% from 25 to 44, 21.6% from 45 to 64, and 12.7% who were 65 years of age or older. The median age was 36 years. For every 100 females, there were 97.0 males. For every 100 females age 18 and over, there were 93.6 males.

The median income for a household in the city was $38,182, and the median income for a family was $46,210. Males had a median income of $31,653 versus $21,400 for females. The per capita income for the city was $17,509. About 7.0% of families and 10.0% of the population were below the poverty line, including 12.2% of those under age 18 and 13.6% of those age 65 or over.

Economy
The economy of the surrounding area is largely agriculture-based. Mandan once had five grain elevators and a flour mill, but none of these remain today. The city continues to support the agricultural industry with livestock sale ring, farm implement dealers and suppliers and finance/lending institutions. But its original purpose was support for the railroad. Subsequent access to rail transportation allowed the agricultural, commercial and industrial sectors to flourish.

In recent decades, Mandan has diversified its economy to include food processing, petroleum refining, electrical power generation, software development, manufacturing and retail trade as well as all manner of professional services for its residents. A federal institution and a state institution border the city.

Information services
National Information Solutions Cooperative (NISC) is an information technology company that develops and supports software and hardware solutions for its member-owners, who are primarily utility cooperatives and broadband companies. NISC provides IT solutions for consumer and subscriber billing, accounting, engineering & operations, as well as other IT solutions. In 2021, IDG Insider Pro and Computerworld Magazine honored NISC as one of the Top 100 "Best Places to Work in IT" for the 18th consecutive year for midsize organizations (companies with 1,001 to 4,999 employees). NISC and its subsidiaries employ over 1,300 people with offices in Iowa, Missouri, North Dakota, and Virginia. Over 450 of these employees work at NISC's Vern Dosch National Campus in Mandan, making it the city's second-largest employer.

Laducer & Associates, Inc. specializes in large-scale information processing, with emphasis on data entry and data capture, for clients including the federal government. It is one of the city's largest private employers.

Energy industry
 A Marathon Petroleum oil refinery north of Mandan began operations in 1954 as a unit of the American Oil Company, with a 29,000 barrels per day (BPD) capacity. Today, the Mandan Refinery's nameplate capacity of 73,800 BPD processes primarily North Dakota sweet (low sulfur) crude oil into a full range of refined petroleum products. The refinery became part of the British Petroleum (BP) system as part of the BP-Amoco merger in January 2001. BP sold the site to Tesoro Corporation in September 2001; Tesoro became Andeavor in August 2017; and Marathon Petroleum purchased Andeavor in October 2018. In total 250 employees are based at the site, including the Andeavor Logistics LP group, which supports trucking and crude pipeline and natural gas transportation and processing operations.

R.M. Heskett Station is an electric generating station operated by Montana-Dakota Utilities Co. along the Missouri River about four miles northeast of downtown Mandan. It hosts two lignite coal-fired boilers, the smaller a spreader stoker and the larger a fluidized design. The smaller of the two units went online in 1954 and has a capacity of 25 megawatts. The second went online in 1963 and is rated at 75 megawatts. A 88MW Simple Cycle Combustion Turbine "peaking unit" was added to the station in July 2014. The plant is named for R.M. Heskett, the founder of Montana-Dakota Utilities Co.

Governmental institutions
As the seat of Morton County, all major governmental service offices are in Mandan, including the courthouse. Morton County employs about 170 people, the majority residing in Mandan. The City of Mandan offices include facilities to house approximately 140 people.

In August 1912, Congress passed a bill to establish the Northern Great Plains Research Station. Ground was broken in September 1913. It remains the country's second-largest federal dry land experimental station. Dry land farming in all of its phases is carried on at the station, as well as the development of new grains and fruits. The station employs approximately 20 people, including doctorate-level professionals.

The North Dakota Youth Correctional Center maintains custody of up to 107 youth committed to its care by the Juvenile Courts. Operated by the State of North Dakota, the campus includes four cottages, administration and education facilities, a gymnasium with an indoor swimming pool, a chapel and a cafeteria. Until 1947 the facility, then called the State Training School, also served as an orphanage, especially for the children of incarcerated criminals. But other orphaned children, typically by accidents, were also assigned there.

Transportation

Freight rail
The city originated to support the operation of the Northern Pacific Railroad. First platting documents were filed in 1873. A rail division headquarters and major maintenance facility were established in Mandan in 1881 to support operation from the Missouri River west to the Yellowstone River near Glendive, Montana. The Northern Pacific became part of the Burlington Northern Railroad in 1970 and part of the Burlington Northern Santa Fe Railway in 1995. Known since 2005 as BNSF Railway, it operates the railroad facilities in Mandan and the surrounding communities. Over 320 BNSF employees are based in Mandan.

Public Transit
Bis-Man Transit provides fixed route and demand response mass transit service to Mandan.

Mandan station
Mandan station was the primary gateway to the city for travelers arriving by passenger train. The depot was built in 1930 by the Northern Pacific Railway with rail service later provided by Burlington Northern Railroad and Amtrak. Passenger trains served Mandan until 1979, when Amtrak's North Coast Hiawatha was discontinued.

Education
Mandan Public Schools operates Roosevelt Elementary School, Mary Stark Elementary School, Lewis & Clark Elementary School, Ft. Lincoln Elementary School, Custer Elementary School, Red Trail Elementary School, Mandan Middle School, Mandan High School, and the Brave Center Academy night school. In 2016, the Mandan Public School District was Morton County's largest employer, with approximately 700 employees.

The city's Catholic parishes (of the Roman Catholic Diocese of Bismarck) operate two private K–6 schools: Christ the King School and St. Joseph School.

Bismarck State College operates two campuses in Mandan focusing on post-secondary vocational education. Its Mechanical Maintenance Technology program is based out of its east Mandan campus. The Electrical Lineworker School is at a facility in northwest Mandan.

Hospitals
Triumph Hospital Central Dakotas is a 41-bed critical care hospital in Mandan.

Local media

Mandan shares a print, radio, and television media market with Bismarck.

Notable people

 Frank L. Anders, Congressional Medal of Honor recipient, engineer, businessman, amateur military historian and politician
 Marlo Anderson, founder of National Day Calendar
 Henry Waldo Coe, Mandan resident, among the first physicians in Dakota Territory, elected to state office, close friend of Theodore Roosevelt
 Tony Dean, television broadcaster, columnist and conservationist. Dean's real name was Anthony DeChandt
 Ivan Dmitri, AKA Levon West; artist, photographer and printmaker; gained international recognition as an artist for his etching "The Spirit of St. Louis"
 Rachel Eckroth, Grammy-nominated musician
 Ron Erhardt, born and grew up in Mandan, became head coach of the New England Patriots 
 Heidi Heitkamp, former U.S. Senator, resides in rural Mandan
 Tom Huff, Washington State Representative
 Richard Longfellow, Congressional Medal of Honor recipient
 Arthur Peterson, Jr., actor born and raised in Mandan
 A. R. Shaw, educator and politician
 Era Bell Thompson, author and editor of Ebony magazine

See also
 Huff Hills
 Fort Abraham Lincoln
 Mandan Refinery
 List of oil pipelines
 List of oil refineries

References

External links

 
Mandan Historical Society website

 
Cities in North Dakota
Cities in Morton County, North Dakota
Bismarck–Mandan
County seats in North Dakota
Populated places established in 1879
North Dakota populated places on the Missouri River